Alfonso Ungría is a Spanish screenwriter and film director.

Selected filmography
 The Man in Hiding  (1971)
 Gone to the Mountain (1974)
 África (1996)

References

Bibliography
 Bentley, Bernard. A Companion to Spanish Cinema. Boydell & Brewer 2008.

External links

1943 births
Living people
Spanish film directors
Spanish screenwriters
People from Madrid